Club Baloncesto Tizona S.A.D., more commonly known as UBU Tizona by sponsorship reasons, is a professional basketball team based in Burgos, Castilla y León and plays in the Polideportivo El Plantío. The team currently plays in LEB Plata.

History
The club started in 2013 as the successor of CB Atapuerca, dissolved after failing to promote to Liga ACB, due to not fulfilling all the requirements.

The name is a homage to former CB Espada Tizona, the main club in Burgos during the 1970s and the 1980s, and was created as a Sociedad Anónima Deportiva with the aim to make easier a future promotion to ACB, goal achieved in its first season. Named Ford Burgos like its predecessor, the club promoted to Liga ACB in the 2013–14 season and did not fulfill all the necessary requirements to enter in the top flight, joining again the LEB Oro league.

In its second season, Tizona promoted again to Liga ACB, this time as LEB Oro champion, after winning its last 13 games in a row. Despite it was the third time in a row Burgos had a team which promoted to the top league, it could not fulfill the requirements to join it.

After failing in its second attempt, the club sued the ACB for not admitting it in the league and decided not entering any competition with the professional LEB Oro team. and continued its activity with the youth teams. The team that acted as reserve teams in the previous seasons, became the main senior team and played in Primera División. Tizona also changed its traditional blue uniform to a red-and-white one for the 2015–16 season, but came back to the blue in the next one for playing in Liga EBA, after its promotion as champions of the Regional group of Primera División.

In July 2017, thanks to the denounce of CB Tizona, local team San Pablo Burgos and Gipuzkoa Basket could promote to Liga ACB.

On 18 May 2019, Tizona came back to professional basketball by achieving promotion to LEB Plata, after winning one of the four groups of the final stage. Just one season later, the club came back to LEB Oro five years later, after the 2019–20 LEB Plata season was curtailed due to the COVID-19 pandemic and Tizona was qualified in the third position when the league was suspended.

Sponsorship naming
(Autocid) Ford Burgos 2013–2015
Universidad de Burgos 2015–2018
UBU Tizona 2018–present

Season by season

Head coaches 
 Andreu Casadevall 2013–2015
 José Luis Cubillo 2015–2017, 2018–2020
 Juan Carlos García 2017–2018
 José Manuel Naveira 2018
 Jorge Elorduy 2020–present

Honors

Trophies
LEB Oro: (1)
2014–15
Copa Castilla y León: (2)
2013, 2014

Individual awards
All LEB Oro Team
Pep Ortega – 2014
Taylor Coppenrath – 2015

References and notes

External links
Federación Española de Baloncesto
CB Tizona Official Page

Sport in Burgos
Basketball teams established in 2013
Basketball teams in Castile and León
Former LEB Oro teams
Liga EBA teams